The Valea Morii (also: Hetiur) is a right tributary of the river Târnava Mare in Romania. It flows into the Târnava Mare near Seleuș.

References

Rivers of Romania
Rivers of Mureș County